Edward "Ed" Scott  (born 28 May 1988 in Leeds, West Yorkshire) is a British water polo goalkeeper/Anaesthetist Superior. At the 2012 Summer Olympics, he competed for the Great Britain men's national water polo team in the men's event. He is 6 ft 5 inches tall. He played in the Spanish División De Honor for CE Mediterrani.

Scott continued to play the game at the highest level, competing for City of Manchester.

See also
 Great Britain men's Olympic water polo team records and statistics
 List of men's Olympic water polo tournament goalkeepers

References

External links
 

1988 births
Living people
Water polo goalkeepers
English male water polo players
Olympic water polo players of Great Britain
Water polo players at the 2012 Summer Olympics
Sportspeople from Leeds